Jacques Lécuyer (14 July 1912 – 3 April 1999) was a French general who after 1940 became a senior résistance leader.

1912 births
1999 deaths
French Resistance members
French generals